The Second Cabinet of Lee Hsien Loong of the Government of Singapore was sworn into office on 30 May 2006, following the 2006 general election for the 11th Parliament. As was the case previously, the Cabinet was made up exclusively of Members of Parliament from the governing People's Action Party (PAP).

Initial composition
Prime Minister Lee Hsien Loong made few changes in his administration. In the only change at the ministerial level, Raymond Lim was promoted to be the Minister for Transport replacing Yeo Cheow Tong. Five new faces were sworn into political office, namely Lui Tuck Yew, Lee Yi Shyan, Grace Fu, Teo Ser Luck and Masagos Zulkifli. They hold the roles of Minister of State or Parliamentary secretaries in political office. Minister for Education Tharman Shanmugaratnam was given another role as Second Minister for Finance. Transport Minister Raymond Lim relinquished his roles as Second Minister for Finance and Minister in the Prime Minister's Office. Minister for Community Development, Youth and Sports Vivian Balakrishnan also had a second post as Second Minister for Information, Communications and the Arts as he relinquished his Second Minister for Trade and Industry portfolio. Senior Minister of State Balaji Sadasivan relinquished his position as Senior Minister of State for Ministry of Health for the Foreign Affairs Ministry. However, he continued as Senior Minister for State for the MICA. Heng Chee How took Balaji's place as Senior Minister of State for Health; he relinquished his appointments in the Ministry of National Development and Mayor for the Central Community Development Council. Zainul Abidin Rasheed was appointed Senior Minister of State for Foreign Affairs and Koo Tsai Kee Minister of State for Defence. Re-elected MPs, namely S Iswaran, Amy Khor and Zainudin Nordin, took political office as well.

The Cabinet of Singapore 2006 consisted of the following persons:

The names in bold are the surnames of Chinese persons, and the personal names of Indian and Malay persons (except for Vivian Balakrishnan and Tharman Shanmugaratnam, where they indicate surnames as well).

As of 1 August 2006 (except as indicated otherwise), the following Members of Parliament were appointed as Ministers of State and Parliamentary Secretaries:

Reshuffles

As of 1 April 2009
A Cabinet reshuffle took place effective as of April 2009. Professor S. Jayakumar relinquished his post of Deputy Prime Minister, and was replaced by Teo Chee Hean. Gan Kim Yong was appointed Minister for Manpower after a year as Acting Minister, and Lim Hwee Hua took up the post of Minister in the Prime Minister's Office, becoming the first woman in Singapore to become a full minister.

As of 1 April 2009, the Cabinet of Singapore consisted of the following persons:

The names in bold are the surnames of Chinese persons, and the personal names of Indian and Malay persons (except for Vivian Balakrishnan and Tharman Shanmugaratnam, where they indicate surnames as well).

As of 1 April 2009 (except as indicated otherwise), the following Members of Parliament were appointed as Ministers of State and Parliamentary Secretaries:

There are five Community Development Councils (CDCs) appointed by the board of management of the People's Association (PA) for districts in Singapore, namely, the Central Singapore CDC, North East CDC, North West CDC, South East CDC and South West CDC. Where the number of residents in a district is not less than 150,000, the PA's board of management is empowered to designate the Chairman of a CDC to be the Mayor for the district that the CDC is appointed for. As it is the practice for MPs to be appointed as Chairmen of CDCs, these MPs have also been designated as Mayors. As of 1 April 2009 (except as indicated otherwise), the Mayors were:

As of 1 November 2010
In October 2010, a further "minor adjustment" was announced. Senior Minister S. Jayakumar relinquished his post of Co-ordinating Minister for National Security, which was taken up by Deputy Prime Minister Wong Kan Seng. In turn, Wong gave up his Home Affairs portfolio in favour of Minister for Law K. Shanmugam. Lui Tuck Yew was promoted to full minister in the Ministry of Information, Communications and the Arts. Thus, as of 1 November 2010, the Cabinet of Singapore consisted of the persons listed in the table below.

The names in bold are the surnames of Chinese persons, and the personal names of Indian and Malay persons (except for Vivian Balakrishnan and Tharman Shanmugaratnam, where they indicate surnames as well).

As of 1 November 2010 (except as indicated otherwise), the following Members of Parliament were appointed as Ministers of State and Parliamentary Secretaries:

References

Executive branch of the government of Singapore
Lists of political office-holders in Singapore
Cabinets established in 2006
Cabinets disestablished in 2011